Carnes Crag is a rock crag,  high, in the northwestern extremity of the Lanterman Range, Bowers Mountains, overlooking the junction of Sledgers Glacier and the Rennick Glacier, Victoria Land, Antarctica. It was mapped by the United States Geological Survey from surveys and from U.S. Navy air photos, 1960–62, and named by the Advisory Committee on Antarctic Names for James J. Carnes, U.S. Navy, chief electrician's friend with the McMurdo Station, Hut Point Peninsula, Ross Island, winter party, 1967. The geographical feature lies situated on the Pennell Coast, a portion of Antarctica lying between Cape Williams and Cape Adare.

References
 

Cliffs of Victoria Land
Pennell Coast